William Frederick Nast (1840–1893) was an American diplomat and entrepreneur. He was the third president of the Atchison, Topeka and Santa Fe Railway.

Nast was born in Cincinnati, Ohio, on June 14, 1840, the son of Methodist religious leader William Nast. From 1861 to 1865 he served at the American Consulate in Stuttgart, Germany. Upon his return to the US, Nast entered the brokerage business in New York City.

On September 2, 1868, Nast became president of the Atchison, Topeka and Santa Fe Railway, a position he held for less than a month, ending on September 24, 1868.

Also in 1868, he married Esther A. Benoist, a daughter of pioneer St. Louis banker Louis Auguste Benoist. They had four children: Louis, Condé, Ethel, and Estelle.

He died in 1893, and was buried at Calvary Cemetery in St. Louis.

Footnotes

References 
 
 
 
 

1840 births
Atchison, Topeka and Santa Fe Railway presidents
Businesspeople from Cincinnati
1893 deaths
19th-century American inventors
19th-century American businesspeople